The Defence Institute of Bio-Energy Research (DIBER) is an Indian defence laboratory of the Defence Research and Development Organisation (DRDO). Located in Haldwani in Uttarakhand state. It conducts research and development of bioenergy as well as the sustainable and eco-friendly high altitude agro-technologies in the Indian Himalayan Region for the use of Indian Military. It has developed a range of vegetable varieties suitable for mid to high altitude.

The present Center Head of DIBER is Shri Devakanta Pahad Singh, Scientist ‘G’.

History 

DIBER has its origin in an "Agriculture Research Unit" (ARU) established 1960s at Sitoli, which was renamed to Pithoragarh-headquartered "Defence Agricultural Research Laboratory" (DARL)in 1990s and to DIBER in 2008.

In 2020, with an intent to make the DRDO leaner and more effective, it was proposed to merge the "Defence Institute of Bio-Energy Research" (DIBER) with Defence Institute of High Altitude Research (DIHAR). The Institute has given its Self Autonomous Status with all its assets and locations. The collaboration with the Defence Food Research Laboratory and the Central Food Technological Research Institute of the Council of Scientific and Industrial Research (CSIR) will be enhanced.

Field stations 

DIBER, which has field stations at Harsil and Auli, has expanded its network of field stations to various agro-climatic zones of India.

Achievements

In 2020, Dr. Hemant Kumar Pandey, PhD, awarded DRDO's "Scientist of the Year Award" by Defence Minister Rajnath Singh for his contribution in developing several herbal medicines, including the Lukoskin drug, a herbal concoction of 8 herbs found in Himalayan region, for treating leucoderma.

Awards and Honorarium

References

External links
 DIBER profile

1990 establishments in Uttar Pradesh
Government agencies established in 1990
Defence Research and Development Organisation laboratories
Research and development in India
Research institutes established in 1990
Education in Nainital district